The 1987 Senior League World Series took place from August 17–22 in Kissimmee, Florida, United States. Athens, Ohio defeated Tampa, Florida twice in the championship game.

Teams

Results

References

Senior League World Series
Senior League World Series
1987 in sports in Florida